Maybell is an unincorporated community and census-designated place (CDP) in and governed by Moffat County, Colorado, United States. The CDP is a part of the Craig, CO Micropolitan Statistical Area. 

The Maybell post office has the ZIP Code 81640. At the 2020 census, the population of the Maybell CDP was 76.

History
The village, founded in the 1880s, was named after May Bell, the wife of a local cattleman. It currently consists of a meat processing plant, general store with gas pumps, a garage, an elementary school, a residential hotel, a restaurant, a post office, and housing. The post office, in operation since 1884, serves the ZIP code 81640.

Geography
Maybell is located in central Moffat County, in the valley of the Yampa River along U.S. Highway 40. State Highway 318 leads northwest from Maybell  to the Utah border, passing Browns Park National Wildlife Refuge.

Climate
This climatic region is typified by large seasonal temperature differences, with warm to hot (and often humid) summers and cold (sometimes severely cold) winters. The climate of Maybell is a humid continental climate (Dfb).

Demographics

See also

 List of census-designated places in Colorado

References

External links

 Maybell, Colorado
 Maybell, Colorado Mining Claims And Mines

Census-designated places in Moffat County, Colorado
Census-designated places in Colorado
Unincorporated communities in Colorado
Unincorporated communities in Moffat County, Colorado